Frank Easton (19 February 1910 – 5 May 1989) was an Australian cricketer. He played eighteen first-class matches for New South Wales between 1933/34 and 1938/39.

See also
 List of New South Wales representative cricketers

References

External links
 

1910 births
1989 deaths
Australian cricketers
New South Wales cricketers
Cricketers from Sydney